Kyle Anthony Pitts (born October 6, 2000) is an American football tight end for the Atlanta Falcons of the National Football League (NFL). He played college football at Florida, where he was named a unanimous All-American and won the John Mackey Award in 2020. 

Pitts was selected fourth overall by the Falcons in the 2021 NFL Draft, making him the highest drafted tight end in NFL history. He was later named to the Pro Bowl as a rookie, the first at his position to do so in two decades.

Early years
Pitts originally attended Abington Senior High School in Abington, Pennsylvania before transferring to Archbishop Wood Catholic High School in Warminster, Pennsylvania in 2016. He played tight end and defensive end on the football team. Pitts played in the 2018 Under Armour All-America Game. He committed to the University of Florida to play college football.

College career
Pitts played in 11 games as a backup his true freshman season at Florida in 2018. He finished the year with three receptions for 73 yards and a touchdown. In 2019, he took over as the starting tight end. Pitts played in all 13 games his sophomore season at Florida in 2019. He finished the year with 54 receptions for 649 yards and 5 touchdowns. Pitts earned First-team All-SEC  for the season.

During the 2020 season, curtailed by the COVID-19 pandemic, Pitts scored 12 touchdowns in eight games while gaining 770 yards on 43 receptions. He was named a unanimous All-American and won the John Mackey Award as the most outstanding tight end in college football for the season.

Statistics

Professional career

Pitts was selected in the first round with the fourth overall by the Atlanta Falcons in the 2021 NFL Draft, making him the highest drafted tight end in NFL history. He signed his four-year rookie contract, worth $32.9 million, on June 29, 2021.

2021 season 

In his NFL debut, Pitts had four receptions for 31 yards in a 6–32 loss to the Philadelphia Eagles in Week 1. In Week 2, Pitts had five catches for 79 yards in a 25–48 loss to the Tampa Bay Buccaneers. In Week 5 against the New York Jets at Tottenham Hotspur Stadium, Pitts caught nine passes for 119 yards and his first NFL touchdown in the 27–20 win. In Week 7 against the Miami Dolphins, Pitts finished with 163 receiving yards as the Falcons won 30–28. His 163 receiving yards set the Falcons franchise record for receiving yards in a single game by a tight end.

In Week 16 against the Detroit Lions, Pitts had six receptions for 102 yards in the 20–16 win. In that game, Pitts surpassed Tony Gonzalez for the Falcon franchise record for the most receiving yards in a single season by a tight end. In Week 17 against the Buffalo Bills, Pitts joined Hall of Famer Mike Ditka as the only rookie tight ends in NFL history to surpass 1,000 receiving yards.

Pitts finished the season with 68 receptions for 1,026 yards and a touchdown. He was named to the 2022 Pro Bowl, making him the first rookie at his position to make the Pro Bowl since Jeremy Shockey in 2002. He was named to the 2021 PFWA All-Rookie Team. He was ranked 91st by his fellow players on the NFL Top 100 Players of 2022.

2022 season 
In Week 3 against the Seattle Seahawks, Pitts had five receptions for 87 yards in the 27–23 win. Pitts was ruled out with a hamstring injury for Week 5 against the Tampa Bay Buccaneers. Pitts returned from injury in Week 6 against the San Francisco 49ers and had his first touchdown of the season. In Week 10 against the Carolina Panthers, Pitts had 5 receptions for 80 yards and a touchdown in the 37–34 overtime win. In Week 11 against the Chicago Bears, Pitts suffered a knee injury in the second half. He was placed on injured reserve the following day for a torn MCL. On November 30, 2022, Pitts was ruled out for the remainder of the season after having surgery to repair the MCL in his right knee.

Pitts finished the season with 28 receptions for 356 yards and two touchdowns.

NFL career statistics

References

External links

Atlanta Falcons bio
Florida Gators bio

2000 births
Living people
All-American college football players
American football tight ends
Atlanta Falcons players
Florida Gators football players
National Conference Pro Bowl players
People from Abington Township, Montgomery County, Pennsylvania
Players of American football from Philadelphia
Sportspeople from Montgomery County, Pennsylvania